Peter Connell (23 November 1912 – 17 September 1964) was an  Australian rules footballer who played with Fitzroy in the Victorian Football League (VFL).

Notes

External links 
		

1912 births
1964 deaths
Australian rules footballers from Victoria (Australia)
Fitzroy Football Club players
Northcote Football Club players